Zina Garrison was the defending champion but lost in the semifinals to Natalia Zvereva.

Martina Navratilova won in the final against Zvereva, 6–4, 7–6(8–6).

Seeds
The top eight seeds receive a bye into the second round.

  Martina Navratilova (Champion)
  Zina Garrison (semifinals)
  Nathalie Tauziat (third round)
  Natalia Zvereva (final)
  Lori McNeil (quarterfinals)
  Meredith McGrath (second round)
  Naoko Sawamatsu (second round)
  Manon Bollegraf (quarterfinals)
  Gretchen Magers (third round)
  Claudia Kohde-Kilsch (first round)
  Catarina Lindqvist (second round)
  Ginger Helgeson (withdrew)
  Anne Minter (second round)
  Stephanie Rehe (first round)
  Akiko Kijimuta (first round)
  Pam Shriver (third round)

Qualifying

Draw

Finals

Top half

Section 1

Section 2

Bottom half

Section 3

Section 4

References
 1991 Dow Classic Draws
 ITF Tournament Page
 ITF singles results page

Dow Classic - Singles
Singles